In mathematics, an elementary matrix is a matrix which differs from the identity matrix by one single elementary row operation. The elementary matrices generate the general linear group  when  is a field. Left multiplication (pre-multiplication) by an elementary matrix represents elementary row operations, while right multiplication (post-multiplication) represents elementary column operations.

Elementary row operations are used in Gaussian elimination to reduce a matrix to row echelon form.  They are also used in Gauss–Jordan elimination to further reduce the matrix to reduced row echelon form.

Elementary row operations
There are three types of elementary matrices, which correspond to three types of row operations (respectively, column operations):

Row switching A row within the matrix can be switched with another row.
 

Row multiplication Each element in a row can be multiplied by a non-zero constant. It is also known as scaling a row.
 

Row addition A row can be replaced by the sum of that row and a multiple of another row.
 

If  is an elementary matrix, as described below, to apply the elementary row operation to a matrix , one multiplies  by the elementary matrix on the left, . The elementary matrix for any row operation is obtained by executing the operation on the identity matrix. This fact can be understood as an instance of the Yoneda lemma applied to the category of matrices.

Row-switching transformations

The first type of row operation on a matrix  switches all matrix elements on row  with their counterparts on row . The corresponding elementary matrix is obtained by swapping row  and row  of the identity matrix. 

Coefficient wise, the matrix  is defined by :

Properties
 The inverse of this matrix is itself: 
 Since the determinant of the identity matrix is unity,   It follows that for any square matrix  (of the correct size), we have

Row-multiplying transformations
The next type of row operation on a matrix  multiplies all elements on row  by  where  is a non-zero scalar (usually a real number).

Coefficient wise, the  matrix is defined by :

Properties
 The inverse of this matrix is given by 
 The matrix and its inverse are diagonal matrices.
  Therefore for a square matrix  (of the correct size), we have

Row-addition transformations
The final type of row operation on a matrix  adds row  multiplied by a scalar  to row .

Coefficient wise, the matrix  is defined by :

Properties
 These transformations are a kind of shear mapping, also known as a transvections.
 The inverse of this matrix is given by 
 The matrix and its inverse are triangular matrices.
  Therefore, for a square matrix  (of the correct size) we have 
 Row-addition transforms satisfy the Steinberg relations.

See also
 Gaussian elimination
 Linear algebra
 System of linear equations
 Matrix (mathematics)
 LU decomposition
 Frobenius matrix

References

 
 
 
 
 
 
 

Linear algebra